Eumeces cholistanensis is a species of skink endemic to Pakistan.

References

Eumeces
Taxa named by Rafaqat Masroor
Reptiles of Pakistan
Reptiles described in 2009